The Nokia 6600 fold is a mobile phone by Nokia. The phone runs the Series 40 platform. This is the 
fold or clamshell version of updated Nokia 6600 series.

The device is sold in three color variants: blue, black and purple.

Features

External links
Nokia 6600 s

References

6600